Geoffrey Charles Fox (born 7 June 1944) is a British-born American theoretical physicist and computer scientist, and distinguished professor of informatics and computing, and physics at Indiana University.

Fox was educated at the Leys School and Trinity College, Cambridge. In 1964, he was the senior wrangler at Cambridge, the best performer in the mathematics tripos. In the same year, he also played in the annual chess match against Oxford University.

He was awarded a Ph.D. in theoretical physics from Cambridge University in 1967 and subsequently worked at Caltech NPAC at Syracuse University from 1990 to 2000, and Florida State University before becoming a professor at Indiana University, where he was the director of the Digital Science Center and associate dean for research and graduate studies at the School of Informatics and Computing. He is currently a Professor in the Biocomplexity Institute & Initiative and Computer Science Department at the University of Virginia. Over the years, Fox has supervised the Ph.D. of 75  students and written over 1200 publications in physics and computer science according, including his book Parallel Computing Works!.

Fox currently works on applications of computer science in bioinformatics, defense, earthquake and ice-sheet science, particle physics, and chemical informatics. His current research interests are Network Systems Science, High Performance Computing and Clouds, AI for Science, Deep Learning for data analytics and simulation surrogates, The Interface of Data Engineering and Data Science with Data Systems.

He was Director of FutureSystems, which was a cyberinfrastructure test to enable development of new approaches to scientific computing before it was shut down in December, 2021. He is engaged in various projects to enhance the capabilities of minority serving institutions.

In 1989, he was elected to Fellow of the American Physical Society "for contributions centered on novel uses of computers; firstly, in the phenomenological comparison of theory and experiment in particle physics, and secondly, in the design and use of parallel computers".

Notes

1944 births
Living people
People from Dunfermline
Free software programmers
Indiana University faculty
Alumni of Trinity College, Cambridge
Computer science educators
Fellows of the Association for Computing Machinery
Fellows of the American Physical Society
Syracuse University faculty
Florida State University faculty
California Institute of Technology faculty